Desnœufs Island is an island in Seychelles, lying at the southern edge of the Amirantes group, in the Outer Islands, with a distance of 321 km south of Victoria, Seychelles.

History
The origin of the name seems to be its French meaning, "one of nine", as it is one of the nine main islands of the Amirantes.

Geography
Desnœufs Island is the southernmost island of the Amirantes chain, is a nearly circular island with a high rim surrounding a central depression (instead of a lagoon). It is up to 5.5 m high. Most of the land is exposed sandstone, after the guano has been exploited in the 20th century. The island has a fringing reef, and the reef flat is narrow. Landing can be extremely difficult, with heavy swells sweeping round the island even during the calmest sea conditions.

Administration
The island belongs to Outer Islands District. 
Being an island with a small population, there are not any government buildings or services. For many services, people have to go to Victoria, which is a difficult task.

Economics
The occasional villagers of Marie Louise Island used to poach eggs illegally on the island when the island was a base for the commercial exploitation of seabirds, especially the eggs of the sooty tern (Onychoprion fuscatus). recent years the island was made a reservation, and is visited once a year shortly by IDC members and scientists from Mahe. 
There are ruins on the island from the time of the poaching.

Flora and fauna
The terrestrial vegetation on the island is limited because of the high number of seabirds. The island is almost treeless and is covered by grasses and other low-growing plants. 
It has been identified as an Important Bird Area (IBA) by BirdLife International because it supports a breeding population of 430,000 pairs of sooty terns, and a large number of boobies. Green and hawksbill sea turtles also nest there.
The island is also known for its rich fish life.

Image gallery

References

External links 

 National Bureau of Statistics
 2010 Sailing directions

Islands of Outer Islands (Seychelles)
Important Bird Areas of Seychelles
Seabird colonies